December Bride is an American old-time radio situation comedy. It was broadcast on CBS from June 8, 1952, to September 6, 1953, replacing Jack Benny's program. CBS television broadcast a version of the program  1954–1959.

Format
In On the Air: The Encyclopedia of Old-Time Radio, John Dunning described Lily Ruskin, the program's main character, as "the precise opposite of the stereotypical mother-in-law. A widow, Lily was a dear lady in every aspect." Other main characters in the program were Ruth Henshaw, Lily's daughter; Matt Henshaw, Ruth's husband; and their next-door neighbor, Pete Porter.

Lily wrote an advice column for a newspaper, and Matt was an architect.

In August 1952, December Bride was one of four sustaining CBS radio programs (along with the Steve Allen Show, Gunsmoke, and Horatio Hornblower) carried over into the fall "to test further their commercial potential.

Personnel
The cast of December Bride is shown in the table below.

Source: On the Air: The Encyclopedia of Old-Time Radio (except as noted)

Johnny Jacobs was the announcer, and Wilbur Hatch provided the music. The program was created and directed by Parke Levy.

Promotion
In December 1952, December Bride held a letter-writing contest with the topic "Why I like my Mother-in-law". The prize was a week's vacation for two to Palm Springs, including being the guests of Spring Byington while there.

References

External links

Logs
Log of December Bride episodes from Jerry Haendiges Vintage Radio Logs
Log of December Bride episodes from Old Time Radio Researchers Group
Log of December Bride episodes from radioGOLDINdex

Streaming
Episodes of December Bride from Old Time Radio Researchers Group Library

1952 radio programme debuts
1953 radio programme endings
1950s American radio programs
CBS Radio programs
American comedy radio programs
Radio programs adapted into television shows